Peace and Neutrality Alliance (PANA)  is an Irish anti-war grouping and a lobby group which campaigns to protect Irish neutrality. It was involved in a number of campaigns such as those against aggression by the State of Israel, against the Iraq War, against the use of Shannon Airport by the US military, and against the Republic of Ireland participating in the NATO-linked Western European Union (WEU).

It was involved in campaigns against the European Union's EU Battlegroup and European Union treaties which it believed would compromise Irish neutrality such as the Amsterdam Treaty, the Nice Treaty and the Lisbon Treaty.

The chairperson and spokesperson for PANA is Roger Cole who is the public face of PANA, making contributions and submissions to various Oireachtas Committees such as the National Forum on Europe and the Committee on European Affairs.

PANA is supported by a variety of other trade union, religious, pressure and political groups such as the Green Party, An Conradh Ceilteach, Sinn Féin, Irish National Congress, Irish Missionary Union, Ionad Buail Isteach na Gaeilge, Latin American Solidarity Centre, National Platform, Communist Party of Ireland, Cork Council of Trade Unions, Dublin Council of Trade Unions, and Workers' Party.

References

External links
Peace and Neutrality Alliance official website

Political advocacy groups in the Republic of Ireland